Ornithinibacter is a genus of Gram positive, nonmotile, non-sporeforming bacteria. The bacteria are strictly aerobic and mesophilic. Cells of the genus are irregular rods that form branching hyphae. The genus name refers to L-Ornithine, the major diagnostic diamino acid in the peptidoglycan. The genus is monospecific, with O. aureus as the only species.

References

Gram-positive bacteria
Bacteria genera
Actinomycetales
Monotypic bacteria genera